FPGA Mezzanine Card (FMC) is an ANSI/VITA (VMEbus International Trade Association) 57.1 standard that defines I/O mezzanine modules with connection to an FPGA or other device with re-configurable I/O capability. It specifies a low profile connector and compact board size for compatibility with several industry standard slot card, blade, low profile motherboard, and mezzanine form factors.

Specifications 

The FMC specification defines:

 I/O mezzanine modules, which connect to carrier cards
 A high-speed connector family of connectors for I/O mezzanine modules
 Supporting up to 10 Gbit/s transmission with adaptively equalized I/O
 Supporting single ended and differential signaling up to 2 Gbit/s
 Numerous I/O available
 The electrical connectivity of the I/O mezzanine module high-speed connector
 Supporting a wide range of signaling standards
 System configurable I/O functionality
 FPGA intimacy
 The mechanical properties of the I/O mezzanine module
 Minimal size
 Scalable from low end to high performance applications
 Conduction and ruggedized support

The FMC specification has two defined sizes: single width (69 mm) and double width (139 mm). The depth of both is about 76.5 mm. The FMC mezzanine module uses a high-pin count 400 pin high-speed array connector. A mechanically compatible low pin count connector with 160 pins can also be used with any of the form factors in the standard.

LPC vs. HPC

FMC allows for two sizes of connector, Low Pin Count (LPC) and High Pin Count (HPC), each offering different (maximum) levels of connectivity, analogous to how some PMC boards have a 32-bit interface while others have a 64-bit interface by using an additional connector. "The LPC connector provides 68 user-defined, single-ended signals or 34 user-defined, differential pairs. The HPC connector provides 160 user-defined, single-ended signals (or 80 user-defined, differential pairs), 10 serial transceiver pairs, and additional clocks. The HPC and LPC connectors use the same mechanical connector. The only difference is which signals are actually populated. Thus, cards with LPC connectors can be plugged into HPC sites, and if properly designed, HPC cards can offer a subset of functionality when plugged into an LPC site."

FMC Geographical Address feature
FMC provides a Geographical Address using two pins (GA1:GA0) 
that are typically used by a mezzanine
device to determine which FMC connector on a carrier 
it is attached to. For cards that have 
only one FMC connector, the default 
geographical address is 00.

Some FMC mezzanine cards may attach other devices 
to the I2C bus and address them through a
system controller, using the geographical address 
as a chip-select. This is not strictly in adherence
with the FMC specification.

See also
 VPX
 Expansion slot

References 

American National Standards Institute standards